16571 / 72 Yesvantpur Junction Bidar Express is an Express train belonging to Indian Railways South Western Railway zone that run between  and . 
The Railway Board has decided to extend the services of Yesvantpur–Bidar Express train services up to Latur in Maharashtra for three days a week from February 2018, the South Western Railway has said in a release.
in India.

Extension to Latur
The Yesvantpur–Latur Tri Weekly Express (16583) will depart from Yesvantpur at 7 p.m. on Wednesday, Friday and Saturday and reach Latur at 1.05 p.m. the next day. En route, the train will have halts at Bidar (9.15/ 9.20 a.m.) and at Latur Road (12.08/12.10 p.m.). In the return direction, the Latur–Yesvantpur Tri Weekly Express (16584) will depart from Latur at 3 p.m. on Thursday, Saturday and Sunday and reach Yesvantpur at 7.40 a.m. En route, the train will have halts at Latur Road (3.35/ 3.37 p.m.) and at Bidar at (6.00/6.05 p.m.).

Meanwhile, the services of Yesvantpur–Bidar (16571) will continue as scheduled on Sunday, Monday, Tuesday and Thursday and that of Bidar–Yesvantpur Express (16572) on Monday, Tuesday, Wednesday and Friday, the release said.

Service 
It operates as train number 16571 from Yesvantpur Junction to Bidar and as train number 16572 in the reverse direction, serving the states of Andhra Pradesh, Telangana & Karnataka.

Coaches

The 16571 / 72 Yesvantpur Junction–Bidar  Express has one AC-1 Tier, one AC 2-Tier, one AC 3-tier, nine sleeper class, four general unreserved & two SLR (seating with luggage rake) coaches . It doesn't carry a pantry car.

As with most train services in India, coach composition may be amended at the discretion of Indian Railways depending on demand.

Routeing

Traction
As this route is partially electrified, a Maula Ali-based diesel WDM-3A pulls the train to its destination. From 2022, the route has been electrified till Bidar and operational. A WAP7 is used to haul 16572/71 from BIDAR to YESVANTPUR JN and back.

References

External links
16571 Yesvantpur Junction–Bidar Express at India Rail Info
16572 Bidar–Yesvantpur Junction Express at India Rail Info

Transport in Bidar
Transport in Bangalore
Express trains in India
Rail transport in Andhra Pradesh
Rail transport in Telangana
Rail transport in Karnataka